Trinity Episcopal Church and Parish House is a historic Episcopal church located at Watertown in Jefferson County, New York. The church was built in 1889-1890 and is massive, rambling Richardsonian Romanesque–style edifice built of random coursed, ashlar stone with a water table and foundation of similar stone.  The parish house was built in 1912–1913.

It was listed on the National Register of Historic Places in 2000.

References

Churches on the National Register of Historic Places in New York (state)
Episcopal church buildings in New York (state)
Churches completed in 1890
19th-century Episcopal church buildings
Gothic Revival church buildings in New York (state)
Romanesque Revival church buildings in New York (state)
National Register of Historic Places in Watertown, New York
Churches in Watertown, New York